Verkhneye Bobino is a rural locality (a village) in Maloustyinsky Selsoviet, Mechetlinsky District, Bashkortostan, Russia. The population was 8 as of 2010. There is 1 street.

Geography 
Verkhneye Bobino is located 13 km northeast of Bolsheustyikinskoye (the district's administrative centre) by road. Nizhneye Bobino is the nearest rural locality.

References 

Rural localities in Mechetlinsky District